Adia Millett Little is a contemporary American multi-media artist whose work can be found in various forums throughout the United States and abroad. Through multiple mediums, including dioramas, quilting, painting, stitching, woodworking, and multi-media works, Millett creates her art to discover transitions and tell stories. "

Biography 
Millett was born in 1975 in Pasadena, California. She was raised by her mother in South Central Los Angeles. Her mother first studied art, but later studied chemistry and earned a doctoral degree in psychology. 

Her father was a famous stage actor and a painter, Cleavon Little. Millett's step-father, who married her mother when she was seven, was an architect and very supportive of her artistic endeavors.

Career 
After completing an undergraduate program and receiving a Bachelors of Fine Arts from the University of California at Berkeley in 1997, Millett continued her education at the California Institute of the Arts, graduating in 2000 with a Masters of Fine Arts.</ref> In 2001, Millett was chosen to participate in the Whitney Museum's Independent Studies Program. In 2002, Millett participated in the Studio Museum in Harlem residency program, and in 2003 became the resident visiting artist at Columbia College in Chicago, Il.  Millett has taught at Columbia College in Chicago, UC Santa Cruz, and Cooper Union in NY as an artist in residence. She currently teaches at California College of the Arts.

Major Projects

Inventing Truth (2001-2002) 
A set of embroidery based artworks, this project addresses loss, memory, and the significance of everyday objects. The seven, small, framed, cross-stitched fabrics depict every day objects including a porkpie hat, a bottle of  Popov vodka, a rifle, a rose, a package of Newport menthol cigarettes, a pair of underwear, and a twenty dollar bill. By presenting objects that are stereotypically associated with black men, Millett creates a juxtaposition within her work between the feminine "craft" of stitching and the masculine subject matter of the individual pieces.

Pre-fabricated Innocence (2004-2010) 
Pre-Fabricated Innocence is an eight part series of miniature houses that caters to our penchant for voyeurism. Each miniature illustrates melancholy interiors that display class and religious beliefs.Pre-fabricated Innocence: Anticipation (light bulbs) from 2004, for instance, is only 11 x 14 inches, but the small prism contains a table with a single chair, a bouquet of flowers, a staircase leading to a closed door, and nine functional lightbulbs. In fact, working lights, furniture, and tiny details are featured in many of Millett's miniatures. The unique decorations within the houses are an attempt to promote a space where dialog is created for characters to develop.

The Fire Next Time (2016) 
The Fire Next Time (2016) is a mixed-medium piece on wood panel that takes its title from James Baldwin’s seminal 1963 book. The miniature is a tiny house surrounded by billowing smoke that stands against a golden backdrop. The small dwelling is made of faded blue vertical planks with a roof of dark wooden shingles that float into the golden sky as the abode burns. This piece presents a visualization of breaking apart.

Infinite Edges Exhibition (2019) 
One of Adia Millett's largest exhibitions to date is entitled "Infinite Edges," and was held from 14 September—9 November 2019 at Traywick Contemporary . This solo exhibition displays Millett's many practices which includes quilt-making, painting, drawing, photography, collage and sculpture. Millet uses these multi-media pieces to highlight the African American experiences while simultaneously speaking to how all living things are connected. Millett's geometric patters draw the viewer's eye from point to point, mimicking the multi-faceted, complex, and fragmented nature of life itself.

Quilts 
Millett's quilts  highlight interconnectivity, as the domestic or "craft" based activity connects pieces of cloth or textile to one another through stitches and string. These artistic quilts simultaneously combine multiple materials and specific cultural references, as the subject matter of each specifically relates to different cultural moments. Chosen Family, for example is one of Millett's pieces from 2018 that combines fabric, textiles, feather, and hand quilting. The pattern of the fabric and textile contained within the piece allude to traditional African textiles, and thick rim of feathers around the circumference of the quilt create a soft boarder that highlights the multi-media nature of the piece.

References 

1975 births
Living people
21st-century American women artists
Artists from Los Angeles
California Institute of the Arts alumni
University of California, Berkeley alumni
American contemporary artists